Milbridge is a census-designated place (CDP) and the primary village in the town of Milbridge, Washington County, Maine, United States. It is in southwestern Washington County, near the center of the town of Milbridge, on the west side of the tidal Narraguagus River. It is bordered to the west by the town of Steuben.

U.S. Route 1 passes through the village, leading north  to Cherryfield and west  to Ellsworth. U.S. Route 1A departs from Route 1 in Milbridge, crossing the Narraguagus and heading northeast, rejoining Route 1 in Harrington and providing a shortcut to points farther east along the coast.

Milbridge was first listed as a CDP prior to the 2020 census.

Demographics

References 

Census-designated places in Washington County, Maine
Census-designated places in Maine